Little India is an ethnic district in Singapore.  It is located east of the Singapore River – across from Chinatown, located west of the river – and north of Kampong Glam. Both areas are part of the urban planning area of Rochor. Little India is commonly known as Tekka in the Indian Singaporean community.

History
Little India is distinct from the Chulia Kampong area, which, under the Raffles Plan of Singapore, was originally a division of colonial-era Singapore where ethnic Indian immigrants would reside under the plan's outline of the formation of ethnic enclaves. However, as Chulia Kampong became more crowded and competition for land escalated, many ethnic Indians emigrants moved into what is now known as Little India. (The Chulia Kampong district no longer exists as a distinct area.)

The Little India area is reported to have developed around a former settlement for Indian convicts. Its location along the Serangoon River originally made it attractive for raising cattle, and trade in livestock was once prominent in the area. Eventually, other economic activity developed, and by the turn of the 20th century, the area began to look like an ethnic Indian neighbourhood.

Little India was the site of a two-hour-long riot on 8 December 2013, after a man was killed in a traffic accident. 27 people were injured, and 40 people were arrested.

Culture

Although ethnic Indians no longer tend to stay solely segregated in one place as previously arranged under the modern People's Action Party (PAP) policy of racial harmony, for the sake of cultural heritage, many of the ethnically Indian commercial or cottage industry usages are concentrated in Little India, although Indian-dominant commercial zones are also found in HDB estates. Contrary to stereotypes, Little India is not solely an Indian neighbourhood. Located in the neighbourhood alongside shops that cater predominantly to the Indians are Chinese clan associations, places of worship of different religions, and a variety of different business ranging from electrical supplies, hardware, second-hand goods alongside traditional spice grinders and grocers. One of the more prominent examples of cross-cultural patronage besides those regarding food is that many Chinese parents go to shops in Little India to grind rice to make congee for infants. The machinery used in this instance was initially flown in from India to grind spices into powder for use in Indian cuisine. Tekka Centre is also multi-cultural, with produce and sundries that cater to the many ethnic groups in Singapore.

Features

Serangoon Road is the main commercial thoroughfare in Little India. It intersects Rochor Canal Road and Bukit Timah Sungei Road. Along Serangoon Road is the Tekka Centre, the Tekka Mall, the Little India Arcade, Serangoon Plaza, and the Mustafa Centre (on a side-road). Farrer Park Fields is located in the district. Several Hindu temples, mosques, and other place of worship include Far Kor Sun Monkey God Temple, Foochow Methodist Church, Kampong Kapor Methodist Church which was completed in 1929, Sri Veeramakaliamman Temple, Angullia Mosque, Sri Vadapathira Kaliamman Temple, Jalan Mosque, and the Central Sikh Gurdwara.

The Abdul Gafoor Mosque, built in 1859 and named after a Tamil lawyer's clerk, features Arabian- and Renaissance-style architecture. Its prayer hall, decorated with Moorish arch-work, displays a tableau featuring the history of the Islamic religion. The Sri Srinivasa Perumal Temple, along Serangoon Road, features a high gopuram (tower), and was built in 1855. The Sakya Muni Buddha Gaya Temple, along Race Course Road, was established by Thai monk Vuthisasara in 1927. Leong San See Temple is built in 1917 and is dedicated to Guanyin, Bodhisattva of Compassion.

Little India also features a few art houses. In 1985, the National Arts Council introduced the Arts Housing Scheme. This scheme sought to identify and refurbish old buildings for arts and cultural purposes. In Little India, a line of shophouses along Kerbau Road was identified to be suitable for the scheme. This is known as the Little India Arts Belt. In 2011, there are seven arts organizations in the Little India Arts Belt. three were contemporary theatre companies while the other organizations involve traditional arts such as Malay dance and Indian theatre.

Transport
The area is served by the following MRT stations: Little India, Farrer Park on the North East line, and Rochor and Jalan Besar on the Downtown line. Bus services 23, 64, 65, 67, 131, 139, 147, and 857 pass through Little India via Serangoon Road.

See also
 Collapse of the Hotel New World
 City Square Mall
 Jalan Besar
 New World Amusement Park
 The Verge, Singapore

References

External links

Downtown Core (Singapore)
Ethnic enclaves in Singapore
Indian diaspora in Singapore
Singapore
Protected areas of Singapore
Places in Singapore
Rochor
Kallang